David Ryan Bakal (born July 15, 1989 in Oakland, California) is an American soccer player who last played for the Los Angeles Blues.

Career

Los Angeles Blues
After playing for the San Diego Flash of the National Premier Soccer League for the 2012 season, Bakal signed for the Los Angeles Blues  of the USL.

References

External links
 USL Pro profile

1989 births
Living people
American soccer players
San Diego Flash players
UC San Diego Tritons men's soccer players
Orange County SC players
Soccer players from California
USL Championship players
Association football midfielders